John Woghere (fl. 1414–1437) of East Grinstead, Sussex, was an English politician and husbandman.

Family
He was the son of Richard Woghere, also an MP for East Grinstead. Woghere married a woman named Margery. If there were children, they are unrecorded.

Career
He was a Member (MP) of the Parliament of England for East Grinstead in
November 1414, May 1421, December 1421, 1423, 1426 and 1437.

References

14th-century births
15th-century deaths
English MPs November 1414
People from East Grinstead
English MPs May 1421
English MPs December 1421
English MPs 1423
English MPs 1426
English MPs 1437